This list is of the Historic Sites of Japan located within the Prefecture of Saitama.

National Historic Sites
As of 28 December 2022, twenty-four Sites have been designated as being of national significance (including one *Special Historic Site).

|-
| align="center"|Kamakura Kaidō Upper RouteKamakura Kaidō kamitsu-michi || Moroyama || || ||  || || 
|-
| align="center"|Sannōzuka KofunSannōzuka kofun || Kawagoe || ||  ||  || || 
|-
| align="center"|Minimamihiki Kiln SiteMinimamihiki kama ato || Hatoyama || || ||  || || 
|-
|}

Prefectural Historic Sites
As of 1 May 2022, one hundred and eighty-six Sites have been designated as being of prefectural importance.

Municipal Historic Sites
As of 1 May 2022, a further five hundred and eleven Sites have been designated as being of municipal importance.

See also

 Cultural Properties of Japan
 Saitama Prefectural Museum of History and Folklore
 List of Places of Scenic Beauty of Japan (Saitama)

References

External links
  Cultural Properties of Saitama Prefecture

Saitama Prefecture
Historic Sites of Japan